Ray Jacobs, known professionally as AUGUST 08 (stylized in all caps), is an American rapper. He co-wrote on the Billboard topping hit "I'm the One" by DJ Khaled featuring Justin Bieber, Quavo, Chance the Rapper, and Lil Wayne. He also wrote on "Fashion Week" by Wale featuring G-Eazy.

Early life

He grew up in South Los Angeles.

Career
In 2018, he signed with American music company 88rising.

Personal life
His older sisters are two.

Discography

Studio Albums 
 2022: Seasick
 2020: Emotional CUH
 2018: Father

Extended Plays 
 2022: Towards the Moon
 2022: Towards the Sun
 2019: Happy Endings with an Asterisk

References

American rappers
Living people
Year of birth missing (living people)
Singers from Los Angeles
People from South Los Angeles